Taryck Gabriel (born 6 April 1995) is a Saint Lucian cricketer. He made his first-class debut for the Windward Islands in the 2016–17 Regional Four Day Competition on 9 December 2016.

References

External links
 

1995 births
Living people
Saint Lucian cricketers
Windward Islands cricketers